The 1985 Valvettiturai massacre happened on May 12, 1985 after 2 landmine attacks killed 10 soldiers and an officer in Valvettiturai. 70 minority Sri Lankan Tamil civilians from the town of Valvettithurai (abbreviated as VVT), Sri Lanka were rounded up. They were asked to go inside the town library and then the library was blown up by the Sri Lankan Army killing all of them. The LTTE would later apparently retaliate in Anuradhapura. In the ensuing weeks dozens more Tamil civilians were also killed.

References

1985 crimes in Sri Lanka
Attacks on civilians attributed to the Sri Lanka Army
Massacres in Sri Lanka
Massacres in 1985
Mass murder of Sri Lankan Tamils
Sri Lankan government forces attacks in Eelam War I
Valvettithurai
Terrorist incidents in Sri Lanka in 1985